Bamberger's was a department store chain with branches primarily in New Jersey and other locations in Delaware, Maryland, New York, and Pennsylvania. The chain was headquartered in Newark, New Jersey.

History

1892–1912 
Newark was known for manufacturing in the last half of the 19th century. By 1892, Newark was the fourth largest American city and it manufactured products from leather to jewelry along with it being a rail hub. It also had a large Jewish population.

It was these factors that lead Felix Fuld, Louis M. Frank, and Louis Bamberger to found the store on Dec 13, 1892 on Market Street on the corner of Halsey Street in Newark, New Jersey, taking over the location of a bankrupt store Hill & Craig. Fuld and Frank were Bamberger's brothers-in-law.

1912–1929
On October 16, 1912 the company opened its flagship store, designed by Jarvis Hunt, at 131 Market Street in downtown Newark. The historic  building once ranked among the nation's largest department stores; after an expansion in 1929 it was the nation's sixth largest.

The massive building covered an entire city block, bounded by Market, Washington, Bank and Halsey Streets - 1.2 million square feet. The phone exchange, 565 was devoted solely to Bamberger's, with local direct-dial numbers for most of New Jersey's suburbs for telephone orders, known as "TeleService". The building's loading dock was located well below ground on the fourth-basement level. Two massive elevators carried fully loaded 33 ft trucks from Washington Street down to the loading docks.

The store had over 200 departments over 9 floors, and 2 basement floors. There was a restaurant on the 10th floor. The layout of the store changed over time but one layout of floor departments can be seen here. Bamberger's had its own Newark Public Library branch and US Post Office branch. It sold customized linens, engraved jewelry, furs and other speciality items.

1929–1959
In June 1929 Bamberger's was purchased by R.H. Macy Co, but the name remained Bamberger's. In the years immediately following World War II, the store was reorganized to become more "mainstream". In 1955, the tenth-floor restaurant complex was leased to the private Downtown Club. Dining service for customers continued at The Dinette, a counter style room on the first basement level and snack bars on the first and fourth floors. Eventually the lower-level eatery was remodeled into a formal restaurant named the Garden State Tea Room.

1960–1986
The 1960s and 1970s saw expansion throughout the state of New Jersey and into the Greater Philadelphia metropolitan area, and by the 1980s there were branches opened in the Baltimore, Maryland metropolitan area. On October 5, 1986, the Bamberger's stores adopted the name Macy's New Jersey, and in 1988 Macy's New Jersey was consolidated with sister division Macy's New York to form Macy's Northeast (now Macy's, Inc.).

As northern New Jersey's population grew, Bamberger's followed the suburban population aggressively. Suburban branch stores of L. Bamberger & Co. were built in other New Jersey locations: downtown Morristown, Plainfield, and at Princeton, New Jersey.  According to Greg Hatala, for nj.com, "With the post-World War II population shift towards the suburbs of major cities, Bamberger's built additional stores in locations such as East Brunswick, Garden State Plaza, Livingston Mall, Monmouth Mall, Nanuet Mall, Ocean County Mall, and Menlo Park Mall.  In 1970, the East Brunswick location became an anchor store for the Brunswick Square Mall".

Sales volume at the downtown Newark store was affected by the Newark civil unrest of 1967 -- sales space was decreased and Newark became a "value oriented" store. Evening hours were eliminated downtown by 1979.

1986–present
In 1986, all Bamberger's stores were renamed Macy's, and the Newark store operated as Macy's until it was closed in 1992.

The flagship store in Newark became 165 Halsey Street and serves the telecommunication, colocation, and computer support industries.

WOR radio
WOR radio was established by Bamberger Broadcasting Service in 1922. The broadcast studio was located on the sixth floor of its downtown headquarters  It was the first radio station on the East Coast to broadcast opera and a morning gym class in the 1920s. Its FM station, W2XOR (then W71NY, now WEPN-FM) began broadcasting in 1940 or 1941. On October 11, 1949, WOR-TV (channel 9) signed on the air, becoming the last of the New York metropolitan area VHF television stations to begin operations; in the same year, Bamberger was re-incorporated to General Teleradio, in part due to General Tire and Rubber's increased investment in the station. Transmission was from the WOR TV Tower in North Bergen, New Jersey, until 1953, and from the Empire State Building thereafter. In 1952, General Tire acquired General Teleradio from Macy's, merging it with the Don Lee Network to form General Tire's broadcasting division.

See also
List of defunct department stores of the United States

References

Defunct department stores based in New Jersey
Companies based in Newark, New Jersey
Retail companies established in 1893
Retail companies disestablished in 1986
Defunct companies based in New Jersey
Skyscrapers in Newark, New Jersey
History of Newark, New Jersey
1893 establishments in New Jersey
1986 disestablishments in New Jersey